is a private university in Hiroshima, Hiroshima, Japan. The predecessor of the school was founded in 1927. It was chartered as a junior college in 1964 and became a four-year college in 1967.

External links
 Official website 

Educational institutions established in 1927
Private universities and colleges in Japan
Universities and colleges in Hiroshima Prefecture
1927 establishments in Japan